Aikens Arch is a natural arch in the U.S. state of California. It is located in San Bernardino County.

References

Natural arches of California